Acleris bergmanniana, the yellow rose button moth, is a moth of the family Tortricidae. It is found from most of Europe to the eastern Palearctic realm.

The wingspan is 12–15 mm. The forewings are marked with metallic blue-grey striations, edged with rufous. There are also two small raised tufts of black scales.

Adults are on wing from June to July.

The larvae feed on the leaves and shoots of rose Rosa species (Rosa canina), as well as Rhamnus cathartica.

References

External links

Lepiforum.de

bergmanniana
Tortricidae of Europe
Moths of Asia
Moths described in 1758
Taxa named by Carl Linnaeus